Owsley Bridge is a historic bridge spanning the Snake River on the Twin-Gooding county line in southern Idaho, United States, that is listed on the National Register of Historic Places.

Description
It is a cantilevered Warren truss bridge built in 1920–21.

The bridge cost about $127,000 (equivalent to $ million in ). The engineer for the state of Idaho was Charles A. Kyle of the Bureau of Highways, Division of Public Works. The builder was United States Bridge Company of Boise, Idaho; the fabricator was the Minneapolis Steel & Machinery Company.

It was listed on the National Register of Historic Places on September 18, 1998.

See also

 List of bridges on the National Register of Historic Places in Idaho
 National Register of Historic Places listings in Gooding County, Idaho
 National Register of Historic Places listings in Twin Falls County, Idaho

References

External links

Road bridges in Idaho
National Register of Historic Places in Gooding County, Idaho
National Register of Historic Places in Twin Falls County, Idaho
Buildings and structures completed in 1921